Shadow Fury is an action/science-fiction film released in Japan on October 30, 2001, starring Sam Bottoms. This is the feature film debut of both Taylor Lautner and Jennette McCurdy.

Plot
A discovery in the near future makes it possible to create genetically engineered and enhanced human clones. The consequence of this discovery results in bio-ethical chaos. In order to right this wrong, the World Health Organization imposes a global ban on all human cloning activity. A group of scientists at the Nova Corporation, a leader in cloning research, have made miraculous advances in the replication of human beings. When one of their colleagues, a mad scientist by the name of Dr. Oh (Morita), creates an "Obedience Strain" that will allow him mind control over the clones, Nova Corp casts him out and revokes his license. Dr. Oh vows revenge on his three partners, Drs. Markov, Forster and Hillier, and creates a clone that is the perfect killing machine, Takeru (Funaki), a killer ninja clone. Meanwhile, Nova Corp learns of Dr. Oh's plan and dispatches a bounty hunter, Madsen (Bottoms), to destroy Dr. Oh, Dr. Oh's laboratory and any clones he may have developed. Madsen has his work cut out for him because with Takeru on the loose, it's only a matter of time before the clone finds them all!

Cast
Taylor Lautner as Kismet (child)
Sam Bottoms as Mitchell Madsen
Masakatsu Funaki as Takeru
Alexandra Kamp as Dr. Louise Forster
Bas Rutten as Kismet (adult)
Fred Williamson as Sam
Pat Morita as  Dr. Oh
Jennette McCurdy as Anna Markov

External links

2001 films